Sarecycline is a narrow-spectrum tetracycline-derived antibiotic.  It is specifically designed for the treatment of acne, and was approved by the FDA in October 2018 for the treatment of inflammatory lesions of non-nodular moderate to severe acne vulgaris in patients 9 years of age and older.  Two randomized and well-controlled clinical trials reported efficacy data on both facial and truncal acne (back and chest). Efficacy was assessed in a total of 2002 subjects 9 years of age and older. Unlike other tetracycline-class antibiotics, sarecycline has a long C7 moiety that extends into and directly interact with the bacterial messenger RNA (mRNA).  The spectrum of activity is limited to clinically relevant Gram-positive bacteria, mainly Cutibacterium acnes, with little or no activity against Gram-negative bacterial microflora commonly found in the human gastrointestinal tract.  Sarecycline has not been tested in spirochetes.

References

External links 
 

Tetracycline antibiotics